Xenosperma is a genus of corticioid fungi in the order Polyporales. Circumscribed by German mycologist Franz Oberwinkler in 1966, the widespread genus contains four species.

References

Polyporales
Taxa described in 1966
Polyporales genera